The following highways are numbered 873:

Canada

United States
Pennsylvania
  Pennsylvania Route 873

Territories
  Puerto Rico Highway 873